Plagiophthalmosuchus is a genus of teleosauroid, known form the Early Jurassic (Early Toarcian) Whitby Mudstone Formation of Whitby, Yorkshire, UK, and Dudelange, Luxembourg. The type species, P. gracilirostris, was originally named as a species of Teleosaurus in 1836, but then it was moved to Steneosaurus in 1961, but it was again moved to its own genus in 2020.

References 

Thalattosuchians
Fossil taxa described in 2020
Prehistoric pseudosuchian genera